The Australian Aircraft Kits Wasp is an Australian ultralight aircraft, designed and produced by Australian Aircraft Kits. The aircraft is supplied as a kit for amateur construction.

Design and development
Designed for flight training and personal use, the Wasp features a strut-braced shoulder-wing, a two-seats-in-side-by-side configuration enclosed cockpit, fixed tricycle landing gear and a single engine in tractor configuration.

The aircraft is made from aluminium all-metal construction. Its  span wing is supported a single strut per side. The standard engine is the  Rotax 912ULS four-stroke powerplant.

Construction from the factory kit takes 300 hours.

Specifications (Wasp)

References

External links

2000s Australian ultralight aircraft
Homebuilt aircraft
Single-engined tractor aircraft
Australian Aircraft Kits aircraft